The 1999 NCAA Division I softball tournament was the eighteenth annual tournament to determine the national champion of NCAA women's collegiate softball. Held during May 1999, forty-eight Division I college softball teams contested the championship. The tournament featured eight regionals of six teams, each in a double elimination format. The 1999 Women's College World Series was held in Oklahoma City, Oklahoma from May 25 through May 31 and marked the conclusion of the 1999 NCAA Division I softball season.  UCLA won their ninth NCAA championship and tenth overall by defeating  3–2 in the final game.  It was the first final game since 1990 to not feature Arizona. UCLA infielder Julie Adams was named Women's College World Series Most Outstanding Player.

Qualifying

Regionals

Regional No. 1
Host: UCLALos Angeles, California

UCLA qualifies for WCWS

Regional No. 2
Host: ArizonaTucson, Arizona

Arizona qualifies for WCWS

Regional No. 3
Host: WashingtonSeattle, Washington

Washington qualifies for WCWS

Regional No. 4
Host: Fresno StateFresno, California

Fresno State qualifies for WCWS

Regional No. 5
Host: LSUBaton Rouge, Louisiana

Southern Miss qualifies for WCWS.

Regional No. 6
Host: MichiganAnn Arbor, Michigan

Arizona State qualifies for WCWS.

Regional No. 7
Host: UMassAmherst, Massathusetts

California qualifies for WCWS.

Regional No. 8
Host: DePaul (games played at Illinois-Chicago)Chicago, illinois

DePaul qualifies for WCWS.

Women's College World Series

Participants

UCLA

Results

Bracket

Championship Game

All-Tournament Team
The following players were members of the All-Tournament Team.

Notes

References

1999 NCAA Division I softball season
NCAA Division I softball tournament